John Burgess (8 November 1924 – 3 May 1997) was an English rugby union player and coach.

Early life and career 
Burgess was born in Salford, England on 8 November 1924. He graduated from the Salford Technical College with a degree in electrical engineering.

Burgess coached the Lancashire rugby team between 1968 – 1973 and the England national rugby union team between 18 January 1975 – 31 May 1975.

Prior to his coaching career, Burgess played for the Old Salfordians Rugby Union team and the Broughton Park RUFC.

Burgess served as President of the Rugby Football Union between 1987 – 1988.

Education 
Burgess studied at Salford Technical College for a degree in electrical engineering.

References 

1924 births
1997 deaths
English rugby union coaches
England national rugby union team coaches
English rugby union players
Lancashire County RFU players
Rugby union players from Salford